When I Look Down That Road is an album by Melissa Manchester, released in 2004.

Track listing
All songs written by Melissa Manchester, except where noted.

 "I'll Know You By Your Heart" (Melissa Manchester, Sharon Vaughn) - 4:35
 "Angels Dancing" (Manchester, Jeff Silbar) - 5:07
 "Bend" (Manchester, Wendy Lands) - 4:20
 "When Paris Was a Woman (According To Alice – 1928) - 5:24
 "After All This Time" (Manchester, Blue Miller) - 3:51
 "Lucky Break" (Manchester, Beth Nielsen Chapman) - 3:39
 "When I Look Down That Road" (Manchester, Stephony Smith) - 3:09
 "Where The Truth Lies" (Manchester, Rupert Holmes) - 4:01
 "TYFYFIM (Thank You For Your Faith in Me)" (Manchester, Zuriani Zonneveld) - 3:47
 "Still Myself" (Manchester, Pam Rose) - 3:38
 "Crazy Loving You" (Manchester, Paul Williams) - 4:02
 "A Mother's Prayer" (Manchester, Karen Taylor-Good) - 3:51
 "It's The Light" (Bonus Track on Japanese CD)

Personnel
 Melissa Manchester – lead vocals, backing vocals (1, 2, 4-11), grand piano (3, 9, 12), string arrangements (3, 4)
 Stephan Oberhoff – grand piano (1, 5), acoustic guitar (1, 2, 3, 5-11), electric guitar (1, 2, 5, 9, 10, 11), bass programming (1, 2, 4, 5, 6, 8, 9, 11), additional percussion (1, 2, 11), drum programming (2, 4, 5, 6, 8, 9, 11), pump organ (3, 6, 7, 10), bass (3, 10), harp (3), string arrangements (3, 4), synthesizer (4, 6, 8, 9), additional guitar (4), Hammond B3 organ (5), cello programming (7), percussion (8, 9), slide guitar (11)
 Peter Hume – acoustic guitar (4)
 Keb' Mo' – dobro (5), slide guitar (5)
 Richie Kotzen – electric guitar (6), backing vocals (6)
 Tom Brechtlein – drums (1, 5)
 Kevin DeRemer – drums (2), percussion (2), grand piano (5), Hammond B3 organ (5), acoustic guitar (5, 6), electric guitar (5), bass programming (5, 6), drum programming (5, 6), synthesizer (6), pump organ (6)
 Cassio Duarte – percussion (1, 4, 6, 11)
 Bara M'Boup – African percussion solo (2)
 Tollak Ollestad – harmonica (2), bass harmonica (2), backing vocals (5, 6, 9)
 Lynn Angebranndt – cello (3, 9)
 Matthew Cooker – cello (4)
 Doug Norwine – clarinet (6)

Production
 Produced and Arranged by Kevin DeRemer and Stephan Oberhoff
 Executive Producers – Kevin DeRemer and Melissa Manchester 
 Recording Engineers – Sjoerd Koppert, Stephan Oberhoff and Joe Vannelli.
 Assistant Engineer – Joe Primeau
 Mixed by Joe Vannelli
 ProTools Editing – Stephan Oberhoff
 Mastered by Brian Gardner at Bernie Grundman Mastering (Hollywood, CA).
 A&R – David Wilkes
 Product Manager – Dan O'Leary
 Art Direction – Jeff Gilligan
 Photography – Randee St. Nicholas

2004 albums
Melissa Manchester albums